Michael Stephens is an American politician currently serving in the Missouri House of Representatives from Missouri's 128th district. He won the seat after defeating Independent candidate Janet Sheffield 85.5% to 14.5%.

Electoral History

State Representatives

References

Republican Party members of the Missouri House of Representatives
21st-century American politicians
Living people
Year of birth missing (living people)